Mykhailo Ilyich Bondarenko (8 September 1903 – 10 February 1938) was a Ukrainian and Soviet politician, who served as the Chairman of the Council of People's Commissars of Ukrainian SSR (today's equivalent of prime-minister) from August to October 1937.

Biography
On 13 October 1937, Bondarenko was arrested during an official trip in Moscow and charged with the belonging to anti-Soviet Trotskyist terrorist and sabotage organization, which acted in the oil industry of the USSR. On 8 February 1938 the Military Collegium of the Supreme Court sentenced him to be shot, and on 10 February he was executed. Bondarenko was rehabilitated by the Military Collegium of the Supreme Court of the USSR on 14 April 1956.

Early life
Mykhailo Bondarenko was born in a peasant family in a town of Yelizavetgrad (present day Kropyvnytskyi), central Ukraine.

References

1903 births
1938 deaths
Politicians from Kropyvnytskyi
People from Yelisavetgradsky Uyezd
Chairpersons of the Council of Ministers of Ukraine
Politburo of the Central Committee of the Communist Party of Ukraine (Soviet Union) members
Recipients of the Order of the Red Banner of Labour
Great Purge victims from Ukraine
Ukrainian people executed by the Soviet Union
Ukrainian people in the Russian Empire
Soviet politicians